The 2010 Korea Grand Prix was a badminton tournament which took place at Gimcheon Indoor Gymnasium in Gimcheon, South Korea from 23 to 28 November 2010 and had a total purse of $50,000. This tournament was upgraded from a BWF International Challenge which have been held from 2007 to 2009 to a Grand Prix event.

Men's singles

Seeds

 Bao Chunlai (champion)
 Park Sung-hwan (second round)
 Shon Wan-ho (quarter-finals)
 Tanongsak Saensomboonsuk (quarter-finals)
 Wong Wing Ki (second round)
 Wang Zhengming (final)
 Hong Ji-hoon (second round)
 Stanislav Pukhov (second round)

Finals

Women's singles

Seeds

 Bae Yeon-ju (quarter-finals)
 Ella Diehl (first round)
 Bae Seung-hee (first round)
 Sung Ji-hyun (semi-finals)
 Li Xuerui (final)
 Ratchanok Intanon (quarter-finals)
 Liu Xin (champion)
 Fransisca Ratnasari (quarter-finals)

Finals

Men's doubles

Seeds

 Jung Jae-sung / Lee Yong-dae (champion)
 Ko Sung-hyun / Yoo Yeon-seong (final)
 Vitalij Durkin / Aleksandr Nikolaenko (second round)
 Goh Wei Shem / Teo Kok Siang (semi-finals)
 Liu Xiaolong / Qiu Zihan (semi-finals)
 Chung Eui-seok / Kim Dae-eun (second round)
 Bodin Issara / Maneepong Jongjit (second round)
 Didit Juang / Seiko Wahyu Kusdianto (second round)

Finals

Women's doubles

Seeds

 Valeria Sorokina / Nina Vislova (quarter-finals)
 Jung Kyung-eun / Yoo Hyun-young (champion)
 Iris Wang / Rena Wang (second round)
 Bao Yixin / Lu Lu (semi-finals)

Finals

Mixed doubles

Seeds

 Ko Sung-hyun / Ha Jung-eun (second round)
 Aleksandr Nikolaenko / Valeria Sorokina (semi-finals)
 Yoo Yeon-seong / Kim Min-jung (champion)
 Vitalij Durkin / Nina Vislova (first round)

Finals

References

External links
 Tournament link

Korea Masters
Korea
Korea Grand Prix Gold
Sport in Gimcheon
November 2010 sports events in South Korea